Teucrium oliverianum is a species of flowering plant in the family Lamiaceae, native to Iraq, Kuwait, Saudi Arabia and Iran. It may also possibly occur in Lebanon and Syria. It was first described by George Bentham, who attributed the name to Frédéric Gingins de la Sarraz, in 1835.

References

oliverianum
Flora of Iraq
Flora of Kuwait
Flora of Iran
Flora of Saudi Arabia
Plants described in 1835